The Clays were an influential nineteenth-century U.S. political and business dynasty.  The Clays are of English stock, and there are quite a few Clay families still in England, and also in other parts of the world.

Alphabetical List of American Clays

Brutus Junius Clay (1808–1878), U.S. Congressman from Kentucky.
Brutus J. Clay II (1847-1932), minister to Switzerland, son of Cassius Marcellus Clay
Cassius Marcellus Clay (1810–1903), abolitionist, publisher, U.S. general, U.S. minister to Russia.
Clement Claiborne Clay (1816–1882), U.S. Senator from Alabama.
Clement Comer Clay (1789–1866), U.S. Senator from Alabama.
Green Clay (1757–1828), member of the Virginia and Kentucky legislatures; Speaker of the Kentucky Senate.
Green Clay Smith (1826–1895), U.S. Congressman from Kentucky and Territorial Governor of Montana.
Henry Clay (1777–1852), U.S. Representative and Senator from Kentucky; Speaker of the House of Representatives; U.S. Secretary of State.
Henry Clay, Jr. (1811–1847), Lt. Col. in the Second Kentucky Regiment, killed in the Battle of Buena Vista.
Henry "Harry" Clay (1849–1884), Arctic explorer; candidate for Kentucky House of Representatives.
James Brown Clay (1817–1864), U.S. Chargé d'affaires at Lisbon, Portugal; U.S. Representative from Kentucky; member of the Peace Conference of 1861; commissioned to raise a regiment for the Confederate States of America.
James Brown Clay (1848–1906), aide-de-camp to Major General John C. Breckinridge.
John Morrison Clay (1821–1887), thoroughbred racer and breeder.
Josephine Russell Clay (1835–1920), thoroughbred breeder and author.
Laura Clay (1849–1941), a leader in the women's suffrage movement.
Mary Barr Clay (1839–1924), president of the American Woman Suffrage Association.
Matthew Clay (1754–1815), U.S. Representative from Virginia.
Matthew Clay (c.1795–1827), member of the Alabama Senate.
Nathaniel W. Watkins (1796–1876), Confederate Army brigadier general and Speaker of the Missouri House of Representatives. 
Nestor Clay (1799–1835), Texas pioneer; representative at the 1832 and 1833 Texas Conventions.
Susan Clay Sawitzky (1897–1981), U.S. poet.
Tacitus Thomas Clay (1824–1868), mayor of Independence, Texas; Confederate army officer.
Thomas Clay (b 1750), member of the first Kentucky Constitutional Convention.
Thomas C. McCreery (1816–1890), U.S. Senator from Kentucky.
Thomas Hart Clay (1803–1871), U.S. minister to Nicaragua and Honduras.
Thomas Jacob Clay (1853–1939) Second Lieutenant, U.S. Army, who participated in the second capture of Geronimo.
William Claude Clay (1917–2004) member of 2677th Office of Strategic Services Regiment (United States) and 2671st Special Reconnaissance Battalion (United States) of the Office of Strategic Services, won various medals of valor.

Chronological List of American Clays

 1750-???? Thomas Clay, member of the first Kentucky Constitutional Convention.
 1754–1815 Matthew Clay, U.S. Representative from Virginia.
 1757–1828 Green Clay, member of the Virginia and Kentucky legislatures; Speaker of the Kentucky Senate.
 1777–1852 Henry Clay, U.S. Representative and Senator from Kentucky; Speaker of the House of Representatives; U.S. Secretary of State.
 1789–1866 Clement Comer Clay, U.S. Senator from Alabama.
 1795?–1827 Matthew Clay, member of the Alabama Senate.
 1796–1876 Nathaniel W. Watkins, Confederate Army brigadier general and Speaker of the Missouri House of Representatives. 
 1799–1835 Nestor Clay, Texas pioneer; representative at the 1832 and 1833 Texas Conventions.
 1803–1871 Thomas Hart Clay, U.S. minister to Nicaragua and Honduras.
 1808–1878 Brutus Junius Clay, U.S. Congressman from Kentucky.
 1810–1903 Cassius Marcellus Clay, abolitionist, publisher, U.S. general, U.S. minister to Russia.
 1811–1847 Henry Clay, Jr., Lt. Col. in the Second Kentucky Regiment, killed in the Battle of Buena Vista.
 1816–1882 Clement Claiborne Clay, U.S. Senator from Alabama.
 1816–1890 Thomas C. McCreery, U.S. Senator from Kentucky.
 1817–1864 James Brown Clay, U.S. Chargé d'affaires at Lisbon, Portugal; U.S. Representative from Kentucky; member of the Peace Conference of 1861; commissioned to raise a regiment for the Confederate States of America.
 1821–1887 John Morrison Clay, thoroughbred racer and breeder.
 1824–1868 Tacitus Thomas Clay, mayor of Independence, Texas; Confederate army officer.
 1826–1895 Green Clay Smith, U.S. Congressman from Kentucky and Territorial Governor of Montana.
 1835–1920 Josephine Russell Clay, thoroughbred breeder and author.
 1839–1924 Mary Barr Clay, president of the American Woman Suffrage Association.
 1847-1932 Brutus J. Clay II, minister to Switzerland, son of Cassius Marcellus Clay
 1848–1906 James Brown Clay, aide-de-camp to Major General John C. Breckinridge.
 1849–1884 Henry "Harry" Clay, Arctic explorer; candidate for Kentucky House of Representatives.
 1849–1941 Laura Clay, a leader in the women's suffrage movement.
 1853–1939 Thomas Jacob Clay Second Lieutenant, U.S. Army, who participated in the second capture of Geronimo.
 1897–1981 Susan Clay Sawitzky, U.S. poet.
 1917–2004 William Claude Clay member of 2677th Office of Strategic Services Regiment (United States) and 2671st Special Reconnaissance Battalion (United States) of the Office of Strategic Services, won various medals of valor.

Descendants of slaves owned by Clays

Henry Clay, Jr. had a slaved named John Henry Clay, whose descendants gained notice in the 20th century.

Cassius Marcellus Clay, Sr., grandson of John Henry Clay, named for the abolitionist Cassius Marcellus Clay.
Muhammad Ali, son of Cassius Marcellus Clay, Sr., born Cassius Marcellus Clay, Jr., boxer, activist, three-time heavyweight champion of the world, Sportsman of the Century.

References

External links
 Clay Family Papers at the Library of Congress
 James Brown Clay
 James Brown Clay
 Laura Clay
 Mary Barr Clay
 Nestor Clay
 Tacitus Thomas Clay
 Tacitus Thomas Clay
 Thomas Jacob Clay
 Various family members active in politics

 
American families of English ancestry
People from Kentucky